John "Johnnie" Shand Kydd (born 1959) is a British photographer. He is the youngest son of Peter Shand Kydd and Janet Munro Kerr, and the former stepbrother to Diana, Princess of Wales. Kydd has exhibited at the National Portrait Gallery in London.

Life and work
Shand Kydd studied Art (and English) at Exeter University, but said that, by then, he had done enough painting to know that he did not want to pursue it, "There's so much crap art around and what's the point of being a mediocre artist?"

After working at a Bond Street art gallery selling 19th-century paintings for a number of years, Shand Kydd began taking photographs of his artist friends and those in his social sphere, using an Instamatic camera. That work was soon collected into the book Spit Fire. The collection was featured in the Sensation show at the Royal Academy in 1997. From this portfolio the National Portrait Gallery acquired 42 prints.

His second book, Crash, documented the progress of his friends.

His most recent publication and photographic exhibition, Siren City, is the result of eight years of photographic research in Naples, a place defined by Shand Kydd as one of the most radical cities in Europe.

Publications
 Spit Fire: Photographs from the Art World, Thames & Hudson in association with Violette Editions, London, 1996/97
 Crash, Damiani, 2006
 Siren City, Other Criteria, London, 2009

References

External links
Images available from Artimage

1959 births
Living people
Photographers from Suffolk